Play UK was a television channel broadcasting in the United Kingdom as part of the UKTV network of channels. Play UK broadcast all day on the digital platforms, but on the Sky Analogue platform on the Astra 19.2°E satellite system it broadcast between 1am and 7am when UK Horizons was not broadcasting.

History
The channel had originally been planned as a television version of BBC Radio 1 but launched without the Radio 1 tie-up as UK Play on 10 October 1998, changing its name to Play UK in November 2000. Like 4Music and Viacom's old Freeview channel Viva, the channel had music programming through the day, while broadcasting comedy during its primetime and evening hours. Most of the comedy programming on Play UK had already been broadcast on the BBC's terrestrial channels, with Play UK adding a few original UKTV-produced comedy programmes as well as a number of  American comedy and animation shows towards the end of its broadcast life.

Closure
On 30 June 2002, it was announced that Play UK would shut down at the end of the year, with the closure of ITV Digital being the reason for its demise. The channel closed on 30 September 2002 at 12am, with its EPG space later being used to launch UK History the following month as part of the launch of Freeview

Some of the channel's comedy programming like The Office, The Fast Show and Shooting Stars were moved to UK Gold following the closure. Other programs were later added to UKG2 upon its launch the following year in November 2003.

Programmes

Music Programming 
The majority of the music programmes broadcast (quizzes, interviews and compilations) on Play UK were produced by UKTV. Play UK also used to air repeats of TOTP2, which were originally broadcast on BBC Two.

Joe's Pop Shop
Mark and Lard's Pop Upstairs Downstairs
 Mental! - The Music Quiz (with Iain Lee)
Pop Will Shoot Itself
Rock Profile (This comedy-music show, lasting from 1999-2002, featured Matt Lucas and David Walliams spoofing various pop bands)
 The Joy of Decks
 The Phone Zone (music request programme using The O Zone branding)
 The Sound of Disco
 The Sound of Play
 The UK Top 20
TOTP@Play

 Original UKTV produced showsThe Alphabet ShowCherry PopThe Chris Moyles ShowEither/Or (1999-2002)futurTVHonky SausagesThe Mitchell and Webb Situation (7 April 2001-2002; 2004)RE:BrandSwivel on the TipTerrorville (2000-2001)UnnovationsVic Reeves Examines  American programmes/other imports Duckman (1999-2001)The Larry Sanders Show (2000-2002) Repeated shows from the BBC archives500 Bus StopsAttention Scum! (2001–2002)Bottom (1998–2001)Bang Bang, It's Reeves and Mortimer (2001)Big Train (1998–2002)Coogan's Run (1999–2001)The Day Today (1999–2002)Dr. Terrible's House of Horrible (2001)The Fast Show (1998–2002)Game On (2000–2002)Goodness Gracious Me (1998–2002)Harry Enfield and Chums (2001–2002)Hippies (2000–2002)Human Remains (2001–2002)I'm Alan Partridge (1999–2002)Introducing Tony Ferrino - Who? And Why? - A Quest (1999–2002)Knowing Me Knowing You with Alan Partridge (1998–2002)LA 7 (2000–2002)The League of Gentlemen (2000–2002)Marion and Geoff (1999–2001)Miami 7 (2000–2001)The Office (2001–2002)Operation Good Guys (2000–2002)Pauline Calf's Wedding Video (2001–2002)The Royle Family (2000–2002)Shooting Stars (1998–2002)Smashie and Nicey: End of an Era (2000–2002)The Smell of Reeves and Mortimer (2001)Stella Street (1999–2002)Stressed Eric (2001–2002)The Tony Ferrino Phenomenon (1999–2002)Two Pints of Lager and a Packet of Crisps (2001–2002)World of Pub'' (1999–2002)

External links
The TV Room looks at presentation/branding on the UKTV channels

References

Defunct television channels in the United Kingdom
Television channels and stations established in 1998
Television channels and stations disestablished in 2002
UKTV
UKTV channels